A whisper is a sound produced by whispering.

Whisper(s) or The Whisper(s) may also refer to:

Fictional characters
 Whisper (Fable), from the video game Fable
 Whisper (Transformers), from Transformers: Micromasters
 Whisper A'Daire, from the DC Comics supervillain team Intergang
 Whisper the Wolf, from the IDW Publishing comic series Sonic the Hedgehog
 The Whisper (Arrowverse), from the TV series Batwoman

Films
 Whisper (film), a 2007 American horror film directed by Stewart Hendler
 Whispers (1920 film), an American comedy drama film directed by William P. S. Earle
 Whispers (1990 film), a Canadian horror film based on the novel by Dean Koontz

Music

Groups
 Mosaic Whispers, or The Whispers, a Washington University co-ed a cappella group
 Ray Brown & the Whispers, a 1960s Australian rock band
 The Whispers, an American R&B singing group

Albums
 Whisper (EP), by VIXX LR, or the title song, 2017
 Whispers (Passenger album) or the title song, 2014
 Whispers (Thomas Anders album), 1991
 The Whispers (album), by the Whispers, 1979

Songs
 "Whisper" (song), by Lacy J. Dalton, 1981
 "Whisper", by 303, 2018
 "Whisper", by Alien Ant Farm from ANThology, 2001
 "Whisper", by Betty Who from Betty
 "Whisper", by Catherine from Hot Saki & Bedtime Stories, 1996
 "Whisper", by Chase Rice, 2016
 "Whisper", by Chaz Jankel from Chazablanca, 1983
 "Whisper", by Evanescence from Fallen, 2003
 "Whisper", by Girls' Generation-TTS from Holler, 2014
 "Whisper", by Meghan Trainor from I'll Sing with You, 2011
 "Whisper", by Morphine from Yes, 1995
 "Whisper", by Shouse, 2016
 "Whisper", by Tyler Joseph from No Phun Intended, 2008
 “A Whisper”, by Coldplay from A Rush of Blood to the Head, 2002
 "The Whisper", by New Kids on the Block from 10, 2013
 "The Whisper", by Queensrÿche from Rage for Order, 1986
 "Whispers" (Corina song), 1991
 "Whispers", by Ian Brown from Music of the Spheres, 2002
 "Whispers", by Luna from Pup Tent, 1997
 "Whispers", by Passenger from Whispers, 2014
 "Whispers", by Symphony X from The Damnation Game, 1995

Publications
 Whisper (comics), a 1980s comic book series published by First Comics
 Whispers (comics), a 2012 comics series by Joshua Luna
 Whispers (magazine), a 1970s horror and fantasy fiction magazine
 Whispers (Koontz novel), a 1980 novel by Dean Koontz
 Whispers (Plain novel), a 1993 novel by Belva Plain
 The Whisper, a 2012 novel by Emma Clayton

Television

Series
 Whisper (TV series), a 2017 South Korean series
 Whispers (TV series), a 2020 Saudi Arabian series
 The Whispers (TV series), a 2015 American science fiction series
Cogar, Irish documentary series (the title is Irish for "whisper")

Episodes
 "Whisper" (Air), 2007
 "Whisper" (Night Gallery), 1973
 "Whisper" (Smallville), 2004
 "Whispers" (Star Trek: Deep Space Nine), 1994
 "Whispers" (Stargate Atlantis), 2008

Other uses
 Whisper (app), a social mobile app of WhisperText LLC, for sharing secrets anonymously
 Whisper (cartridge family), a type of ammunition cartridge for firearms
 Whisper (feminine hygiene), a trade name for Always products in some Asian countries and Australia
 Whispers (radio series), a British radio comedy panel game
 Whisper Aircraft Whisper, a South African two-seat kit motoglider
 Whisper Systems, an enterprise mobile security company acquired by Twitter in 2011
 Whisper X350 Generation II, a South African two-seat kit aircraft

See also
 Cadbury Wispa, a brand of chocolate bar
 WSPR (disambiguation)